Restore is the debut and only extended play by South Korean duo Jinjin & Rocky, a sub-unit of the boy band Astro. It was released on January 17, 2022, through Fantagio and Kakao Entertainment. The EP was promoted by the lead single "Just Breath", released the same day along with its music video.

Promotion
Throughout December 2021 and January 2022, Fantagio released video teasers and concept posters for the EP on their social media, including imagery of "humanoid blobs" and references to social distancing in the wake of the COVID-19 pandemic. The EP more broadly has a vacation theme and a "summer vibe".

Track listing

Charts

Weekly charts

Monthly charts

Notes

References

2022 EPs
Korean-language EPs